Patrick Gaubert (born 6 July 1948) is a Paris-born French politician who was a Member of the European Parliament for the Île-de-France through 2009. He is a member of the Union for a Popular Movement, which is part of the European People's Party, and was vice-chair of the European Parliament's Committee on Civil Liberties, Justice and Home Affairs. He was also a substitute for the Committee on Foreign Affairs and a member of the delegation for relations with Israel.

Gaubert was one of six Members of the European Parliament who participated in the European Union's observer mission in Togo for the October 2007 Togolese parliamentary election.

Career
 Doctor of dental surgery, attached to the Paris hospitals
 Special adviser in the office of the Minister for the Interior (France), with responsibility for measures against racism (1986–1988)
 Special adviser in the office of the Minister of State and Minister for the Interior and Regional Planning (both France), with responsibility for combating racism and xenophobia (1993–1995)
 Coordinator of national and departmental units in France for combating racism, anti-Semitism and xenophobia
 Member of Courbevoie (France) Municipal Council
 Chairman of the RPR group on Courbevoie (France) Municipal Council (1982–1986)
 President of the International League against Racism and Anti-Semitism (LICRA) (since 1999)
 Member of the Internet Ethics Committee (since 2004)
 Knight of the (French) National Order of Merit (1995)
 Knight of the (French) Legion of Honour (2001)

References

1948 births
Living people
Politicians from Paris
MEPs for Île-de-France 2004–2009
Union for a Popular Movement MEPs
French dentists
Chevaliers of the Légion d'honneur